Graham Garland Ross  (1944 – 31 October 2021) was a Scottish theoretical physicist who was the Emeritus Professor of Physics at the University of Oxford and Emeritus Fellow of Wadham College.

Career
Ross was known for constructing models of fundamental interactions and verifying them by experimentation. With others, while at the European Organization for Nuclear Research (CERN) in Geneva, he predicted that gluon radiation would generate collimated jets of particles in electron–positron annihilation, which subsequently established the existence of the gluon. He made contributions to the foundation of the perturbative treatment of quantum chromodynamics, applying it to high-energy processes and developing connections with the low-energy quark model. He developed predictions of unified models of the fundamental forces for polarised lepton scattering, for sin2θW, for proton decay, and for inflationary cosmology. He discovered that in supersymmetric models, the electroweak symmetry can be broken by quantum effects, and he was among the first researchers to develop models based on this idea.

Personal life
Ross died suddenly on 31 October 2021.

Awards and honours
Ross was elected a Fellow of the Royal Society (FRS) in 1991. In 2012, he was given the Dirac Medal by the Institute of Physics for his theoretical work in developing both the Standard Model of fundamental particles and forces and theories beyond the Standard Model that have led to many new insights into the origins and nature of the universe.

References

1944 births
2021 deaths
People from Aberdeen
Scottish physicists
20th-century British physicists
21st-century British physicists
Theoretical physicists
People associated with CERN
Fellows of Wadham College, Oxford
Fellows of the Royal Society
Department of Physics, University of Oxford
Alumni of Durham University